Totò contro i quattro, internationally released as Toto vs. the Four, is a 1963 Italian comedy film directed by Steno. Despite its title, it was not a true fusion between Totò and the four, but the film consists in interwoven episodies in which Totò makes pair from time to time with one of them. It was defined as a "winningly funny police farce".

Plot 
At the Commissioner Antonio is stolen the car during a night. He needs to find her first address four cases of thievery in the city of Rome. The defendants are Peppino De Filippo, Aldo Fabrizi, Nino Taranto and Erminio Macario.
Thanks to the stories these four funny characters at the end Antonio, moreover, by disguising woman, manages to capture the thieves in an area of Villa Borghese.

Cast 
Totò: Police Commissioner Antonio Saracino
Peppino De Filippo: Cav. Alfredo Fiore
Aldo Fabrizi: Don Amilcare
Nino Taranto: Giuseppe Mastrillo
Erminio Macario: Colonel La Matta
Ugo d'Alessio:  Di Sabato
Carlo delle Piane: Pecorino
Mario Castellani: Comm. Filippo Lancetti
Pietro Carloni : brother in law of Lancetti 
Rossella Como: Wife of Lancetti
Dany París: Jacqueline
Ivy Holzer: Miss Durant
Moira Orfei: Miss Fiore 
Nino Terzo: Agent Pappalardo
Gregorio Wu Pak Chiu : domestic Chinese
Mariano Laurenti : car driver of Fiat 600

References

External links
 

1963 films
Films directed by Stefano Vanzina
Italian comedy films
Police detective films
1960s police comedy films
Films set in Rome
Films with screenplays by Giovanni Grimaldi
1963 comedy films
1960s Italian-language films
1960s Italian films